Tampa Tushy Fest, Part 1 is a 1999 American pornographic film directed by Seymore Butts (Adam Glasser) and starring Alisha Klass, Samantha Stylle, Montana Gunn, and Chloe Nicholle. It became a center of a legal case about obscenity in California. The film features fisting, a sexual act where a hand is inserted into a vagina or anus, which Los Angeles City attorney Deborah Sanchez considered an obscenity.

Cast 
 Alisha Klass
 Samantha Stylle 
 Montana Gunn 
 Chloe Nicholle

Award 
At the 17th AVN Awards in 2000 the film won the "Best All-Girl Sex Scene - Video" award.

Legal history 
On December 15, 2000, the Los Angeles Police Department raided the office of porn director and producer Seymore Butts. He was charged with two counts of obscenity by Deputy Los Angeles City attorney Deborah Sanchez. Trial was scheduled for March 20, 2002, when it would have become the first obscenity trial in Los Angeles since 1993. On the trial date Glasser settled with the Los Angeles City attorney's office agreeing to pay 1000 dollar to a victims restitution fund. He was also mandated to produce a censored version of the film for California and was allowed to sell uncensored versions as well.

References 

1999 films
1990s pornographic films
American pornographic films
Films shot in Florida
Films set in Tampa, Florida
1990s English-language films
1990s American films